Michael Marshall (born October 6, 1965), also known and credited as Mike Marshall and Mike Meezy, is an American singer, songwriter and is the former lead singer of American R&B group Timex Social Club.  As a solo artist, his singing voice is featured on the chorus of the Luniz certified platinum international hit song "I Got 5 On It".  His singing voice is also featured on international top 10 dance hit  "Your Body", with DJ Tom Novy  and sings “San Francisco” in the film The Last Black Man in San Francisco. Marshall still tours, and has completed his third solo R&B album, Grown & Sexy.

Discography

Studio albums
Love, Lies and Life (2005)
Soul of the Bay (2008)
In the Mean Time & in Between Time (2010)
Right Where I'm ‘posed 2 Be (2013)	
Grown & Sexy (2018)

Collaboration albums
Vicious Rumors with Timex Social Club (1986)
K.I.M. with Equipto (2004)
K.I.M. II: Keep It Movin' 2 Love Changes with Equipto (2011)
KIM 2.5 Forever Unfinished with Equipto (2017)

Extended plays
Simply Meezy (2013)
Green Room (2016)

References

20th-century African-American male singers
American contemporary R&B singers
Living people
1965 births
Musicians from Berkeley, California
Singers from California
21st-century African-American people